Star singers also known as Epiphany singers, or Star boys' singing procession (England), are children and young people walking from house to house with a star on a rod and often wearing crowns and dressed in clothes to resemble the Three Magi (variously also known as Three Kings or Three Wise Men). The singing processions have their roots in an old medieval ecclesiastical play, centred on the Biblical Magi of the Christmas story in the Gospel of Matthew (Mt 2,1-28), appropriate to Epiphany. It is observed usually during the period between 27 December and 6 January (the feast of the Epiphany).

In Scandinavia and Central Europe a special set of songs, distinct from Christmas carols has developed in this context. In England, the liturgical drama developed from being performed by cathedral schoolboys in the 16th century to become a more secular mystery drama, containing also some ordinary Christmas songs and carols. Historically performed by boys and male adolescents only, it is nowadays performed by children and young people of both sexes in most regions where the tradition is alive.

History 
At a synod in Konstanz in Germany at Christmas in 1417 the British clergies performed the Star boy drama for the rest of the participants at the meeting. They wore expensive costumes and had a large shining star. The performance was a huge success at the church conference and could have been one of the main reasons for growing popularity of the drama in post-medieval Europe.

The importance of the Twelfth Day and the feast of the Epiphany grew with the introduction of the Gregorian calendar as the day, according to the earlier Julian calendar, is also the Old Christmas Day.

After the Reformation in the 16th century, pupils of the cathedral schools in Protestant nations conducted these processions to raise funds to replace the church support that had disappeared. The custom passed further on to the general populace as a kind of narrative folk drama, but seems to have declined in its original form since the late 19th century.

Since then the singing procession has become common in many parts of Europe (both in Catholic and Protestant areas) and in Russia. In most countries it is no longer restricted to boys, but children or both sexes participate. In Germany, Austria and Belgium organisations centrally organise the processions, collecting money for charity or international aid projects, leading to a widespread support of the custom.

Central Europe 

In Germany, the Czech Republic and Austria the Epiphany singing is performed at or close to Epiphany (6 January) and has developed into a nationwide custom, where the children of both sexes call on every door and are given sweets and money for charity projects - mostly in aid of poorer children in other countries.

A tradition in most of Central Europe involves writing a blessing above the main door of the home. For instance if the year is 2014, it would be "20 * C + M + B + 14". The initials refer to the Latin phrase "Christus mansionem benedicat" (= May Christ bless this house); folkloristically the letters are often interpreted as the names of the Three Wise Men (Caspar, Melchior, Balthasar). In Catholic parts of Germany and in Austria, this is done by the Sternsinger (literally "Star singers"). After having sung their songs, recited a poem, and collected donations for children in poorer parts of the world, they will chalk the blessing on the top of the door frame or place a sticker with the blessing.

In Germany 
Annually around 300 000 people are active in collecting donations in Germany.

In Austria 
In Austria the biggest carol singing campaign is organized by the "DKA" (Dreikönigsaktion), an aid foundation founded by the youth organization Katholische Jungschar. Annually about 85,000 children and 30,000 adults take part in the "Dreikönigsaktion".

In Slovakia 
The biggest carol singing campaign in Slovakia is Dobrá Novina (English: "Good News"). It is also one of the biggest charity campaigns by young people in the country. Dobrá Novina is organized by the youth organization eRko.

England and Scotland 

The Star singers, aged about ten to fifteen, are dressed in long white shirts and pointed brown or white paper hats, in imitation of a well-known picture of the Biblical Magi as Babylonians Balthazar carries the star and Caspar and Melchior are armed with wooden swords. The other characters usually do not disguise themselves but also dress in long shirts, often in brown, green or grey colours and conical hats. Joseph has got a cylindrical paper hat and a wooden timber or broad axe. King Herod wears a crown and he and his soldiers carry wooden swords. In the crowd there may also be shepherds with long shirts and sticks and some angels with white shirts and wings.

The Star singers walk about from house to house "singing at the doors, with a star on a pole". The dramatic part is introduced by one of the Wise Men knocking on someone's door asking: "May the star come in?" If the offer is accepted, they are all invited inside. Then the whole procession will enter the home singing a special Christmas carol. Then the play begins.

In the performance, the Three Wise Men, Gaspar, Melchior and Balthazar, are first confronted by Joseph, who tries to protect the newborn baby Jesus (a doll) and his wife Mary from the intruders with a wooden axe. The three magi are however most welcome inside after saying that they have brought with them presents for the child. The Wise Men also have to mislead King Herod, who is also trying to find the new born 'prince' in the stable. Both Gaspar and Melchior fight the king and his men with swords, together with Joseph who uses his broad axe, while Mary nurses her son and Balthazar takes care of the shining star.

After the performance Judas comes to collect money or other gifts from the audience in a large bag. The boys and girls are usually treated to drinks and cakes afterwards. Then the Star singers leave the house for their next visit to somewhere in the neighbourhood, singing a song containing a farewell and many thanks for the received gifts.

The star itself is made anew each year, using transparent paper on a constructed frame built of wooden lists and with one to three candles placed inside. The star on the rod has to be movable and turned around all the time, so that the paper does not get overheated and does not go up in flame.

The Star boys' singing procession in England seems later to have been mixed together with several other kinds of carol singers at Christmas. They do not go from house to house, but visit two or three local pubs to receive free beer. Nowadays they are not carrying the shining star anymore, but just a quadrangular paraffin wax on a long stick or even a candle lamp with an ordinary handle. Whereas religious folk plays are the norm in the rest of Europe, the British folk drama is absolutely secular, even if they are mostly taking place on the Christian festival days.

"Stjernespill" in Scandinavia and Finland 

In the Nordic countries the Star boys' singing procession is known all along the coast, though not often in inland communities. At the end of the 1880s many objected to this Catholic form of organised begging, and officials began forbidding the practice. By the 1900s it had largely disappeared, and there are now just a few places where the original play of the Star boys can be counted as an unbroken linear tradition, for instance the islands Amager in Denmark, and Haram and Vigra on the west coast of Norway, but the most famous one is probably the Star boys' singing procession in the small town of Grimstad on the south coast of Norway.

Sweden 
In 19th century the Swedish Star boys started to join in with horse riding on St. Stephen's Day, 26 December. The tradition of Star boys (sometimes even with Judas Iscariot), singing and acting about Christmas, Saint Stephen and Epiphany, has traditionally been performed from St. Stephen's Day until Epiphany.

Today they are only to be seen bringing up the rear together with bridesmaids and elves as a part of the Lucia procession on 13 December. Recently school teachers, nursery nurses and Christian clergymen have tried to revitalize the play for small children, inviting their parents to come to the schools, the kindergartens or the churches to see it performed. But the popular and more humorous folkloristic elements of the play are often left out.

Finland 
In Finland, a version of the Star boys' procession originating in the city of Oulu, a musical play known as Tiernapojat, has become established as a cherished Christmas tradition nationwide. The Tiernapojat show is a staple of Christmas festivities in schools, kindergartens, and elsewhere, and it is broadcast every Christmas on radio and television. The Finnish version contains non-biblical elements such as king Herod vanquishing the "king of the Moors", and a short song of praise to Tsar Alexander.

Star singer songs 
 ,text and melody from Bavaria (18th century).
 , text: Rolf Krenzer, melody: Ludger Stühlmeyer (ZDF-Star singer event 1999).
 , text and melodie: Kurt Rommel.
 , text: Friedrich Spee, melody: Cologn, 1880.
 , Leipzig 1884.
 , text and melody from Swissland (19th century).
 , text and melody from Austria.
 , from Bavaria.
 , text: Diethard Zils, melody: France 1874.
 , text: Rolf Krenzer, melody Peter Janssens.
 , text: Georg Thurmair, melody: Adolf Lohmann.
 , text: Peter Gerloff, melody: Ludger Stühlmeyer, 2016.
 , text: Zils, melody: France 18. Jahrhundert.
 , text and melody: Alfred Hans Zoller, 1964.
 , Folk song.
 , text: Maria Ferschl, melody: Heinrich Rohr.
 , text and music: Kurt Mikula.

See also 
 Cavalcade of Magi
 Chalking the door (Scotland)
 King Cake
 kolęda (Poland)
 Liturgical drama
 Medieval theatre
 Mystery play
 Rosca de reyes
 :cs:Tříkrálová sbírka (Czech Republic)

References

Bibliography 
 Manfred Becker-Huberti: Die Heiligen Drei Könige. Geschichten, Legenden und Bräuche. Greven Verlag, Köln. .
 Carsten Bregenhøj: Helligtrekongersløb på Agersø: Socialt, statistik og strukturelt. Dansk Folkemindesamling, Skrifter 3. Copenhagen 1974.
 Laurits Bødker: Folk Literature (Germanic). International Dictionary of Regional European Ethnology and Folklore Volume II. Rosenkilde and Bagger. Copenhagen 1965.
 Hilding Celander: Stjärngossarna. Deres visor och julspel. Nordiska museets Handlingar:38. Stockholm 1950.
 Frederick J. Marker & Lise-Lone Marker: A history of Scandinavian theatre. Cambridge University Press. Cambridge 1996.
 Erik Henning Edvardsen 1993, see Hans Wiers-Jenssen & Haakon Hougen.
 Terry Gunnell: The Origins of Drama in Scandinavia. D.S. Brewer, Woodbridge 1994 (1995).
 B. Hayward (1992) Galoshins: The Scottish Folk Play. Edinburgh University Press, Edinburgh 1992. 
 Reidar Kjellberg: Helligtrekonger (p. 205-210). At gavne og fornøie. Et utvalg av hans arbeider ved Gordon Hølmebakk. Gyldendal Norsk Forlag, Oslo 1984.
 : En gammeldags julaften. Juleaften. Aktieselsk. Biglers Forlag. Kristiania [1897].
 Iørn Piø: Bogen om julen. Historien om julen og dens traditioner. Sesam. Copenhagen 1998. 
 Klara Semb: Julestjerna. For Bygd og By nr. 25–26. Julenummer 1925.
 Kathleen Stokker: Keeping Christmas. Yuletide Traditions in Norway and the New Land. Minnesota Historical Society Press. MS 2000. .
 Hans Wiers-Jenssen & Haakon Hougen: Stjernespill og stjernesang i Norge. "Norvegia Sacra" 1921 og 1937. [Reprint of earlier periodical articles and an updated investigation of later oral and written sources to the star play, the singing procession and the star boy tradition in Norway and a short description of the custom elsewhere in the world, by Erik Henning Edvardsen, p. V-VII and p. 109- 160.] Norsk Folkeminnelags skrifter nr. 138 / Norsk Folkeminnelag. Oslo 1993. .

External links 
 Website about charities that are helped by Star singers in Germany  (in German)
 The Three Wise Men in the Catholic Youth Organization in Austria (in German)
 Historic, Finnish sourches from North Österbotten (Pohjois-Pohjanmaan) Museum (in Finnish)
 Taru Kolehmainen: Julesanger (Joululaulujen) – the expression of tradition (in Finnish)
 Preparation for the star play in Oulun (in Finnish)
 Star Boys in Helsinki Finland (in Finnish)

Medieval drama
Drama
Christmas traditions in Europe
January events
Slavic Christmas traditions
Biblical Magi
Epiphany music